Finns proper are a historic people and a modern subgroup (heimo) of the Finnish people. They live in the areas of the historical province of Finland Proper (Varsinais-Suomi) and Satakunta, and they speak Southwestern dialects of Finnish. The Finns proper have had strong connections to Scandinavia throughout their history.

Originally, the exonym "Finland" and the endonym "Suomi" referred only to the Southwestern region inhabited by Finns proper. Later, the meaning of these names expanded to refer to the whole area of modern Finland. Earlier, the name "Finn" meant Sami people, especially in older Norse sagas.

The Russian name Сумь, 'Sum', which appears in Novgorodian chronicles, is believed to refer to Finns proper. "Sums" are mentioned as allies of Swedes at the Battle of Neva at 1240.

Sauli Niinistö, the 12th president of Finland (years 2012-2024), is a Finn proper.

See also
 Tavastians
 Baltic Finns
Ostrobothnians

References

Ethnic groups in Finland